Harvey Edward Yarnall (born December 4, 1975) is a former professional baseball pitcher. He pitched parts of two seasons in Major League Baseball with the New York Yankees, and two seasons in Japan with the Orix BlueWave.

Career
Yarnall played college baseball for the LSU Tigers, and was part of their 1996 College World Series championship team. In 1995, he played collegiate summer baseball with the Harwich Mariners of the Cape Cod Baseball League and was named a league all-star.

He was drafted by the New York Mets in the third round of the 1996 Major League Baseball Draft. In 1998, he was traded with Preston Wilson and minor leaguer Geoff Goetz to the Florida Marlins for Mike Piazza. Prior to the 1999 season, he was traded with Mark Johnson and minor leaguer Todd Noel to the New York Yankees for Mike Lowell.

Yarnall made his major league debut with the Yankees in 1999. In 2000, he was traded with Jackson Melián, Drew Henson and Brian Reith to the Cincinnati Reds for Mike Frank and Denny Neagle. Prior to the 2001 season, he was released by the Reds.

Yarnall played two seasons in Japan for the Orix BlueWave in 2001 and 2002. He returned to the United States in 2003, pitching in the minor league organizations of the Oakland Athletics, Boston Red Sox, Philadelphia Phillies, Washington Nationals, and Kansas City Royals. Most recently, he pitched for the independent Long Island Ducks and Mexican League Vaqueros Laguna in 2007.

References

External links
, or Pura Pelota

1975 births
Living people
All-American college baseball players
American expatriate baseball players in Japan
American expatriate baseball players in Mexico
Baseball players from Pennsylvania
Binghamton Mets players
Charlotte Knights players
Columbus Clippers players
Harwich Mariners players
Leones del Caracas players
American expatriate baseball players in Venezuela
Long Island Ducks players
Louisville RiverBats players
LSU Tigers baseball players
Major League Baseball pitchers
Mexican League baseball pitchers
New Orleans Zephyrs players
New York Yankees players
Nippon Professional Baseball pitchers
Norfolk Tides players
Omaha Royals players
Orix BlueWave players
Pawtucket Red Sox players
People from Middletown Township, Delaware County, Pennsylvania
Portland Sea Dogs players
Sacramento River Cats players
Scranton/Wilkes-Barre Red Barons players
St. Lucie Mets players
Yarnall, Ed
Vaqueros Laguna players